Los hombres de Paco (English: Paco's Men) is a Spanish television series that originally aired from 9 October 2005 to 19 May 2010 on Antena 3. Created by Daniel Écija and Álex Pina, it stars numerous actors; primarily Paco Tous and Pepón Nieto. The fiction primarily focused on a group of clumsy yet good-hearted police agents.

General
The fiction focused on a group of police officers in San Antonio, a fictitious neighborhood in Madrid, originally following a trio of clumsy yet good-hearted police agents: Paco, Mariano and Lucas, overseen by Don Lorenzo Castro Riquelme. The "forbidden" love story between Lucas and Sara (Paco's daughter) was another of the main storylines of the series, later turned into a love triangle with the addition of Aitor.
Season 6 featured a big jumping the shark moment, by retconning the non-death of Lucas.

The series had seasons six through eight centered on a lesbian relationship between officer María Jose "Pepa" Miranda Ramos and forensic scientist Silvia Castro León. Season 8 ended with a finale, "Todos los planes de Lucas Fernández", that brought the wedding of Pepa and Silvia, which resulted into a blood bath and the tragic death of four main characters (Silvia, Montoya, Nelson and Quique).

In season 9, dubbed as Los hombres de Paco 66.6, the series jumped the shark again, taking a supernatural turn by bringing Silvia back from the dead as a phantasmagorical apparition and pitting the lead characters against Satan.

Episodes

Season 1

Season 2

Season 3

Season 4

Season 5

Season 6

Season 7

Season 8

Season 9

Cast 

 Paco Tous as Francisco "Paco" Miranda Ramos (2005–2010; 2021)
 Pepón Nieto as Mariano Moreno (2005–2010; 2021)
 Juan Diego as Don Lorenzo Castro Riquelme (2005–2010)
 Marián Aguilera as Silvia Castro León (2005–2010)

 Hugo Silva as Lucas Fernández (2005–2010; 2021)
 Michelle Jenner as Sara Miranda Castro (2005–2010; 2021)
 Cristina Plazas as Marina Salgado (2008–2010)
 Federico Celada as Curtis Naranjo (2005–2010)
 Carlos Santos as José Luis Povedilla Turriente (2005–2010; 2021)
 Neus Sanz as Margarita "Rita" Peláez (2005–2010; 2021)
 Mario Casas as Aitor Carrasco Menéndez (2007–2010; 2021)
 Aitor Luna as Gonzalo Montoya (2005–2009)
 Enrique Martínez as Enrique "Quique" Gallardo (2005–2009)

 Marcos Gracia as Daniel Andradas (2010)

 Adriana Ozores as Dolores "Lola" Castro León (2005–2009)
 Clara Lago as Carlota Fernández (2007–2008)
 Neus Asensi as Bernarda González (2005–2007)

 Alan Bond-Ballard as George (2009)
 Lucía Caraballo (2009)
Introduced in season 5
 Laura Sánchez as Pepa.
 Rubén Ochandiano as Enrique.
 Francesc Garrido as Portillo.
  as Félix.
 Miko Jarry as André Salazar.
  as Philippe Mignon.
 Erica Prior as Alison Morris.
Introduced in season 7
 Jimmy Castro as Nelson.
Introduced in seasons 8 and 9
 Goya Toledo as inspectora Reyes.
 Benjamín Vicuña as Deker.
 Marcos García as Dani.
  as Lis.
 Alex Hernández as Goyo.
 Ángela Cremonte as Amaya.
 Asier Etxeandía as Blackman.
Introduced in seasons 10 and 11
  as Dolores Urbizu.
 Amaia Sagasti as Ika.
  as Rober.

Development, production and release 
Aired on Antena 3, the original broadcasting run of the first 9 seasons spanned from 9 October 2005 to 19 May 2010.

The series was also broadcast in Argentina, Bulgaria, Czech Republic, Poland, Hungary, Morocco, Romania, Serbia, Italy, Slovakia and Turkey.

Return
On 22 April 2020 it was announced that Atresmedia was preparing a return of the series after a decade-long hiatus and that filming would begin in the summer of that same year if the COVID-19 crisis allowed it. The return of Paco Tous, Pepón Nieto, Carlos Santos and Neus Sanz was reported. On 24 June 2020, actors Hugo Silva and Michelle Jenner announced that they would return to the series in their respective roles. New additions to the cast included Amparo Larrañaga, Amaia Sagasti and Juan Grandinetti.

Montse García, Marc Cistaré and Javier Pons were credited as executive producers. Direction was tasked to Alejandro Bazzano, Sandra Gallego Christensen, Víctor García León, David Molina, Marc Vigil, Jesús Rodrigo, Marc Cistaré, Jacob Santana and Tom Fernández.

Season 10 premiered on Antena 3 on 10 May 2021, with subsequent episodes slated for an exclusive original release on Atresplayer Premium. The episode earned 2,691,000 viewers and a 19.5% audience share.

Awards and nominations

|-
| rowspan="3" align = "center" | 2007
| 9th ATV Awards
| Best Actress in a TV Series
| Adriana Ozores
| 
| 
|-
| 57th Fotogramas de Plata
| Best Television Actor
| Hugo Silva
| 
| 
|-
| 16th Actors Union Awards
| Television: Lead Performance, Male
| Paco Tous
| 
| 
|-
| align = "center" | 2008
| Zapping Awards
| Best Actress
| Adriana Ozores
| 
| 
|-
| align = "center" | 2009
| 18th Actors Union Awards
| Television: Minor Performance, Male
| Carlos Santos
| 
| 
|-
| rowspan="2" align = "center" |  2010
| rowspan="2"| 60th Fotogramas de Plata
| Best Television Actor
| Juan Diego
| 
| 
|-
| Best Television Actress
| Marián Aguilera
| 
| 
|}

References
Informational notes

Citations

External links
 Official Website
 Los hombres de Paco at the Internet Movie Database

2005 Spanish television series debuts
Spanish LGBT-related television shows
Lesbian-related television shows
Television shows set in Madrid
Antena 3 (Spanish TV channel) network series
2000s LGBT-related drama television series
2000s Spanish drama television series
2010s Spanish drama television series
2000s Spanish comedy television series
2010s Spanish comedy television series
2000s comedy-drama television series
2010s comedy-drama television series
Spanish comedy-drama television series
Spanish crime comedy television series
Spanish police procedural television series
2020s comedy-drama television series
2020s Spanish drama television series
2020s Spanish comedy television series
Television series by Globomedia